Eleanor "Teach" Tennant (1895 – May 11, 1974) was a tennis player and coach from the U.S., notable for the being the first female player to turn professional. Tennant was once ranked third in America and was the coach of Grand Slam winners Alice Marble, Bobby Riggs, Pauline Betz, and Maureen Connolly. Tennant also coached Hollywood stars including Clark Gable and Carole Lombard, who gave her the nickname Teach.

Grand Slam finals

Doubles: (1 runner-up)

Further reading

References

1895 births
American female tennis players
American tennis coaches
1974 deaths
20th-century American women
20th-century American people